Cosmiphis is a genus of mites in the family Laelapidae.

Species
 Cosmiphis bosschai (Oudemans, 1901)

References

Laelapidae